Marzanabad (also Romanized as Marzanābād; also known as Marzūnābād and Murzānābād) is a city in Kelardasht District, in Chalus County, Mazandaran Province, Iran.  At the 2006 census, its population was 5,078, in 1,335 families.

Marzanabad is the closest green city of Mazandaran province to Tehran while passing through the beautiful road of Tehran-Chalus, one of three major roads that connect Tehran to Mazandaran province, and the shortest path towards Caspian Sea from Tehran.

Marzanabad is located on a T-junction of the roads towards Tehran, Chalus and Kelardasht. It is about 25 km away from both Chalus and Kelardasht while it is about 170 km away from Tehran via Tehran-Chalus road. Due to the location of the city, it attracts thousands of tourists each year from all parts of Iran, but especially from Tehran.

Marzanabad is close to the site of the medieval town of Sa‘īdābād, which served as a garrison town during Abbasid times.

References

Cities in Mazandaran Province
Populated places in Chalus County